{{DISPLAYTITLE:C21H27NO2}}
The molecular formula C21H27NO2 (molar mass: 325.44 g/mol) may refer to:

 Etafenone, a vasodilator
 Ifenprodil
 Norpropoxyphene
 SR 59230A

Molecular formulas